The men's 4 × 100 metres relay competition at the 2006 Asian Games in Doha, Qatar was held on 11 and 12 December 2006 at the Khalifa International Stadium.

Schedule
All times are Arabia Standard Time (UTC+03:00)

Records

Results 
Legend
DNF — Did not finish

1st round 
 Qualification: First 3 in each heat (Q) and the next 2 fastest (q) advance to the final.

Heat 1

Heat 2

Final

References

External links
Results – 1st Round Heat 1
Results – 1st Round Heat 2

Athletics at the 2006 Asian Games
2006